Khorusi-ye Jonubi (also Romanized as Khorūsī-ye Jonūbī) is a village in Salami Rural District, Khanafereh District, Shadegan County, Khuzestan Province, Iran. At the 2006 census, its population was 3,759, in 609 families.

References 

Populated places in Shadegan County